The Høgsenga Crags are high rock crags which form the northern extremity of Breplogen Mountain in the Mühlig-Hofmann Mountains of Queen Maud Land, Antarctica. They were mapped from surveys and air photos by the Sixth Norwegian Antarctic Expedition (1956–60) and named Høgsenga (the high bed).

References

Cliffs of Queen Maud Land
Princess Astrid Coast